Barjols is a commune in the Var department in the Provence-Alpes-Côte d'Azur region in southeastern France.

At the gateway to Haute Provence and the hills of Var, near the Verdon gorges and the Lake of St. Croix, the town is set on a limestone cliff. Featuring 42 fountains, Barjols' architecture and life have been determined for centuries by the omnipresence of water. Historical buildings include the 11th century Collegiate Church. Leather was the mainstay of the village economy until the late 20th century when production moved to emerging economies and decline set in. Owing to this more recent industry, Barjols did not embrace tourism, and has kept many features and characters of French village life.

Sites of interest
The Collegiate Church of Notre Dame de I'Assomption,
Portal of Ponteves
Regional Water Museum
 The fountains
 Vineyards

Neighbouring villages
Tavernes (5 km),
Varages (7 km),
Châteauvert (8 km),
Cotignac (15 km)
Brue Auriac (10 km).

See also
Communes of the Var department

References

Communes of Var (department)